FGV may refer to:

 Felda Global Ventures Holdings, a Malaysian plantation and food product company
 Ferrocarrils de la Generalitat Valenciana, a Spanish railway company
 Fichtelgebirge Club, a German walking club
 Fundação Getúlio Vargas, a Brazilian think tank